George Heyman is a Canadian politician and former social, environmental and labour activist. He has represented the district of Vancouver-Fairview in the Legislative Assembly of British Columbia since 2013 as a member of the British Columbia New Democratic Party (BC NDP). He currently serves as Minister of Environment and Climate Change Strategy of British Columbia.

Background
He was born in Vancouver to Stefan and Marta Heyman, a Polish-Jewish couple who escaped occupied Poland during the Second World War by way of Japan with the help of Chiune Sugihara, the Japanese Empire vice-consul at Kaunas, Lithuania. The Heymans were sponsored by relatives in Canada, settling in Vancouver where Stefan worked as a machinist while getting his engineering credentials recognized.

Heyman briefly worked as a logger before becoming a log scaler with the British Columbia Ministry of Forests in 1978. He became involved in the labour movement, eventually serving as president of the British Columbia Government and Service Employees' Union (BCGEU) from 1999 to 2008. As a representative of BCGEU, he was a federal government appointee as a governor of the Canadian Centre for Occupational Health and Safety from 1998 to 2000. He also served on the governing panel of administrators of the B.C. Workers’ Compensation Board (now WorkSafeBC) from 1997 to 2001, and chaired the WCB’s audit committee.

From April 2009 to December 2012 Heyman served as executive director of the Sierra Club BC. He oversaw the financial and administrative health of the organization as well as being Sierra Club’s primary public spokesperson on issues regarding energy, mining, conservation of species and habitat, climate change, environmental assessment, forest management and sustainable economic alternatives. Effective January 1, 2013, he took a leave of absence to run in the provincial election.

Politics
Heyman faced high-profile Vancouver city councillor Geoff Meggs in the nomination contest to become the BC NDP candidate for Vancouver-Fairview in the 2013 provincial election. The contest was described by Norman Ruff, professor emeritus at the University of Victoria, as a "clash of titans." While both candidates were considered potential cabinet material, The Globe and Mail reported that Heyman had "the right stuff to be a power player" in an NDP government. On October 21, 2012, Heyman defeated Meggs by winning 58% of the votes, becoming the party's candidate Vancouver-Fairview.

Heyman won the seat on election day, defeating incumbent BC Liberal cabinet minister Margaret MacDiarmid. With the NDP once again forming the official opposition, Heyman at one point considered running in the 2014 leadership election to replace Adrian Dix before deciding against it. In the 40th Parliament of British Columbia he served as critic for the environment, green economy and technology. Until February 2016 he also held responsibility for film, television and TransLink.

After winning re-election in the 2017 provincial election, Heyman was appointed the Minister of Environment and Climate Change Strategy in the newly formed NDP minority government on July 18, 2017.

Heyman defeated Liberal candidate and former Vancouver city councillor George Affleck at the 2020 provincial election, as the NDP achieved a majority government. Following the election, on November 24, 2020 he was given the additional role of Minister responsible for TransLink in the second cabinet of Premier John Horgan. In the new cabinet announced by Premier David Eby on December 7, 2022, he retained the post of Minister of Environment and Climate Change Strategy, while the separate TransLink portfolio was abolished.

Electoral record

References

External links

 George Heyman
 MLA Profile

Canadian trade unionists
Canadian environmentalists
Sierra Club people
Living people
Members of the Executive Council of British Columbia
British Columbia New Democratic Party MLAs
Politicians from Vancouver
Academic staff of Simon Fraser University
Year of birth missing (living people)
21st-century Canadian politicians
Jewish Canadian politicians